Efstratios Grivas (born March 30, 1966) is a Greek chess player who holds the titles of Grandmaster, FIDE Senior Trainer, International Arbiter, and FIDE International Organizer.

Early years
He was born in Egio, Achaia and grew up in Athens, in the neighbourhood of Kallithea, as his family moved to the Greek capital in 1970. His registration at the Kallithea Chess Club in 1979 was his first contact with chess. Two years later he won the Greek Cadet Championship, under the guidance of FM Panagiotis Drepaniotis (1979–1981).

He wrote the book "The Grivas Sicilian".

Chess career

A relatively late starter, Grivas was taught how to play at a chess club when he was 13 years old. He was later trained by IM Dr. Nikolai Minev (1981–1982), FM Michalis Kaloskambis (1984–1986), GM Efim Geller (1987–1988) and IM Nikolai Andrianov (1990–1996). He took part in a FIDE training camp in Moscow in 1984.

Grivas has played in Greece for the following clubs: Kallithea Chess Club (1979–1994), OAA “Iraklion” (1995–1998), Kavala Chess Club (1999), AO “Kydon” Khania (2000–2005) and A.E.K. (2006-).

From 1982 until 1999 he represented Greece 186 times (12 in the National Junior Team and 174 in the National Men's Team), having participated in eight Olympiads (1984, 1986, 1988, 1990, 1992, 1994, 1996, 1998), three European Team Chess Championships (1989, 1992, 1997), and twelve Balkaniads (1982, 1983, 1984, 1985, 1986, 1987, 1988, 1989, 1990, 1992, 1993, 1994).

His greatest success was winning the Silver Individual Medal (on 3rd board) at the 33rd Chess Olympiad in 1998. Other important successes were the Gold Individual Medal (on the 3rd board) at the European Team Championship in 1989, 4th place at the World Junior Chess Championship in 1985, 1st place at the 1987 Munich international tournament (320 participants), 11th individual place (on the 4th board) at the 32nd Chess Olympiad in 1996, qualification of his club (OAA “Iraklion”) to Europe's best 16 clubs in 1997 (European Club Cup)

He scored the following at international tournaments: 3rd in Paris 1982, 1st in Cap d'Agde 1983, 2nd in Karditsa 1984, 3rd in Bucharest 1984, 2nd in Strasbourg 1985, 2nd in Munich 1986, 3rd in Xanthi 1991, 2nd in Gausdal 1993, 3rd in Reykjavík 1994, 2nd in Limassol 1997, 1st in Hellexpo-Sportexpo 2001.

His handles on the Internet Chess Club are "E-Grivas" and "Gref".

Author
From 1982 on he successfully worked as a journalist in newspapers and magazines (in Greek and in English). Between January 1992 and September 1999 he was editor-in-chief and main contributor of the monthly magazine of the Greek Chess Federation, Greek Chess.

In 2010 he was awarded the Boleslavsky Medal (best author) for 2009.

Administrator and organizer
He was a founding member of the Association of Top Greek Chessplayers (1995) and has since been a member of its Policy Board (Executive Secretary 1996-1997 and Vice-President since 1998). From 1996 until 1999 he held the position of Greek Chess Federation Technical Advisor. Finally, he served as a member of FIDE's Players’ Council (1998–2002). He holds the titles of FIDE International Organizer (was a co-organizer of the 1999 European Youth Chess Championships in Litochoro Pierias with more than 1000 participants) and FIDE International Arbiter, titles that are awarded according to specific requirements and are not honorary.

Trainer
His work in this field includes more than 12000 hours of training in many clubs, especially with younger players. From 1986 to 1991 he was the Federal Trainer of the National Juniors Team. During the period 1989–1990 he was the Trainer of the DEI Macedonia-Thrace Chess Academy, while during 1996–1998 and 2002–2004 he held the same position in Pnevmatiki Stegi Peristeriou Chess Club and finally during 2002–2005 he worked with Koropi Sports & Chess Club as well. In 2001–2002 he worked as a professor at the Institute of Professional Education in Peristeri and as External Contributor with O.E.E.K. (Sports Department - Chess Trainer Faculty) while from 2001–2004 he also offered his chess services to the Military Officers’ Academy.

In 2004 Grivas was awarded the title of FIDE Senior Trainer.

Notable games
Efstratios Grivas vs Nigel Short, Ol. 1986, Queen's Gambit Declined: Tartakower Defense (D58), 1-0
Efstratios Grivas vs Vladimir Tukmakov, Kavala op 1991, Queen's Indian Defense: Classical Variation (E17), 1-0
Efstratios Grivas vs Zhaoqin Peng, Corus (Group C) 2008, Zukertort Opening: Queen Pawn Defense (A06), 1-0
Efstratios Grivas vs Arik Braun, Corus (Group C) 2008, Slav Defense: Breyer Variation (D11), 1-0

Books

References

External links
 
 
 Exclusive Video Interview
 Efstratios Grivas at 365Chess.com
 Official Website
 Interview
 

1966 births
Living people
Chess grandmasters
Chess coaches
Greek chess players
Greek non-fiction writers
Chess writers
Chess officials
Chess arbiters
Chess Olympiad competitors
Sportspeople from Athens
20th-century Greek people